David Barclay of Ury (1610 – October 12, 1686) was a Scottish professional soldier, courtier and the first Laird of Ury. A soldier of fortune, Barclay fought for Gustavus Adolphus, King of Sweden during the Thirty Years' War, and with the Earl of Middleton during the Wars of the Three Kingdoms.

Background

Barclay was the son of David Barclay (1580–1660), 11th of Mathers, of Kincardineshire, Scotland and Elizabeth Livingstone, daughter of John Livingston of Dunipace.

Career 
In 1626, he ventured to France to become a soldier of fortune. In 1630, he rose to the rank of a major under Gustavus Adolphus, King of Sweden, during the Thirty Years War. He returned to Scotland in 1636 to serve in the covenanting army, becoming colonel of a cavalry regiment under General John Middleton. 

In 1648, he purchased the lands and barony of Ury in Kincardineshire (modern-day Aberdeenshire) from William Keith, 7th Earl of Marischal. As a known associate of the Earl Marischal he was subsequently confined in Edinburgh Castle where he met the John Swinton, who was confined in the same prison. 

In 1660, the Restoration ended the Civil War. Barclay served at the court of Charles II and he became an influential figure at Whitehall and Edinburgh.

Family
Barclay married French noblewoman Katherine Petau de Maulette (1621–1663) on the 24th of December 1647. Katherine was a cousin of Genevieve Petau de Maulette, French tutor of Elizabeth Stuart 'the Winter Queen', and was also a third cousin of Charles II. 

Barclay and Katherine had the following issue:

 Jean Barclay (1663–1720), married Sir Ewen Cameron of Lochiel, to whom she bore eight children
 Lucille Barclay (born 1657) who died unmarried.
 Robert Barclay (born 1648) the eldest son, who became celebrated as the apologist for the Quakers. 
 John Barclay (born 1650) the second son, settled in East Jersey in America, where he married and left children.
 David Barclay (born 1653) who died unmarried.

References

Further reading
ODNB article by Brian M. Halloran, "Barclay, Robert (1611/12–1682)", Oxford Dictionary of National Biography, Oxford University Press, 2004, accessed December 3, 2007.

External links
 The History of the Surname Barclay
 Genealogical Account of the Barclays of Urie

1610 births
1686 deaths
Converts to Quakerism
Scottish Quakers
17th-century Quakers
David
People from Kincardine and Mearns
Lairds
Scottish soldiers
Scottish people of the Thirty Years' War
Covenanters